The 2013 CARIFTA Games took place between March 30-April 1, 2013.  The event was held at the Thomas Robinson Stadium in Nassau, Bahamas.  A report of the event was given for the IAAF. The games mark the seventh time in which the event was held in The Bahamas. The other years being 1976, 1978, 1981, 1984, 1992 and 2002.

Bidding Process
Bidding took place during the 2012 CARIFTA Games held in Bermuda. Initially four countries, namely the Bahamas, Barbados, the Cayman Islands and Martinique, had showed some interest in hosting the games. But ultimately Martinique withdrew its bid in favour of the Bahamas, and Barbados did not come forward with an official bid. The Bahamas was eventually chosen over the Cayman Islands to host the event. This was attributed to a myriad of reasons such as the newly constructed Thomas Robinson Stadium, the Bahamas's fortieth independence celebrations in 2013, and the fact that the country hadn't host the event in ten years.

Venue
The 2013 Games will be staged in the 15,000 seater, thirty million dollar Thomas A. Robinson National Stadium. Fifty million dollars are being spent to beautify the area and upgrade utilities around the stadium, which is the Queen Elizabeth Sports Centre, in time for both the CARIFTA games and the IAAF World Relays.

Austin Sealy Award
The Austin Sealy Trophy for the
most outstanding athlete of the games was awarded to Shaunae Miller, Bahamas. She won three gold medals (200 m, 400 m, and 4x100
metres relay) in the junior (U-20) category setting a new 200m games record in
22.77s.

Records
A total of 7 new championship records (CR) were set.

Key

Medal summary
Medal winners were published for boys and for girls.

Boys under 20 (Junior)

†: Open event for both junior and youth athletes.
‡: Exhibition event (no medals).

Girls under 20 (Junior)

†: Open event for both junior and youth athletes.
‡: Exhibition event (no medals).

Boys under 17 (Youth)

‡: Exhibition event (no medals).

Girls under 17 (Youth)

Special Olympics - Boys

‡: Exhibition event (no medals).

Special Olympics - Girls

‡: Exhibition event (no medals).

Medal table (official)
The official count is in accordance with the medal count published by Carifta 2013's Local Organizing Committee.

Participation
According to an unofficial count (without relays and special olympics), 423 athletes from 25 countries participated. 

 (5)
 (5)
 (3)
 (59)
 (28)
 (23)
 (22)
 (12)
 (7)
 (10)
/ (3)
 (13)
/ (17)
 (8)
 Haïti (12)
 (69)
/ (9)
 (9)
 (6)
 (4)
 (5)
 (12)
 (40)
 (24)
 (18)

References

External links
 www.carifta2013.com

CARIFTA Games
CARIFTA
CARIFTA Games
CARIFTA Games
2013 in Caribbean sport